Plakhino is a village (selo) in Zakharovsky District of Ryazan Oblast, Russia.  It is the birthplace of Alexander Vasilyevich Alexandrov, author of the music for the National Anthem of the Soviet Union.

References

Rural localities in Ryazan Oblast
Mikhaylovsky Uyezd